The IRTA Cup in motorcycling is a championship match within each of the three categories of Grand Prix motorcycle racing for privateer teams — that is, those who run machines without direct support from manufacturers. It is run under the auspices of the International Road Racing Teams Association.

It is now known as the Michel Metraux Cup.

Grand Prix motorcycle racing